David S. Kirk is an American sociologist and professor of sociology in the Department of Sociology and Nuffield College, Oxford. Before joining the Oxford faculty in 2015, he was an associate professor in the department of sociology at the University of Texas at Austin. His research interests have included the effects of high concentrations of former prisoners in a neighborhood on their probability of reoffending, and the effects of Uber on rates of drunk driving in the United States.

References

External links 
 Faculty page
 

Living people
American sociologists
Academics of the University of Oxford
Fellows of Nuffield College, Oxford
Vanderbilt University alumni
University of Chicago alumni
Year of birth missing (living people)